Triple & Touch is a Swedish pop duo formed in Gothenburg in 1983. Earlier, Lasse Kronér (born 1962 in Gothenburg) was also a member until 1999, when he succeeded Leif Olsson for the leadership for the TV gameshow Bingolotto.

History

1980s 

Featuring Swedish singer Lotta Engberg, Triple & Touch competed in the Swedish Eurovision Song Contest Melodifestivalen 1988 with the song "100%". The song won a third place. 
The trio sang in the choir for Swedish musician Björn Afzelius on his 1988 tour.

1990s 

During the 1990s, the group (with Lasse Kronér) led the TV show "Musikjägarna". 
Triple & Touch were the hosts of the Swedish Melodifestivalen 1993.

2000s 

In 2000, the duo Wennerholm and Rudbo led a summer entertainment from the park Trädgårdsföreningen in Gothenburg. 
During the season of the TV show På spåret 2005/2006 Rudbo/Wennerholm were members of the band.

Personnel 

 Ken Wennerholm – vocals (1983–present)
 Göran Rudbo – vocals (1983–present)
 Håkan Glänte – vocals (1983–1989)
 Lasse Kronér – vocals (1985–1999)

Discography 

 T&T (1993)
 1000 gånger (1996)
 De 3 vise männen (1998)
 Duetter i stereo (2000)

Citations 

Swedish musical groups
Melodifestivalen contestants of 1988